Shane O'Donnell (born 15 June 1994) is an Irish hurler who played as a forward for the Clare senior team.

Born in Ennis, County Clare, O'Donnell first arrived on the inter-county scene at the age of sixteen when he first linked up with the Clare minor team, before later lining out with the under-21 side. He made his senior debut in the 2013 Waterford Crystal Cup. O'Donnell has since gone on to play a key part for Clare, and has won one All-Ireland medal and one Waterford Crystal Cup medal.

At club level O'Donnell plays with Éire Óg, Ennis. He missed the 2019 National Hurling League as he was awarded a Fulbright Scholarship to Harvard University in the US.

Playing career

Inter-county

O'Donnell made his senior debut during the pre-season Waterford Crystal Cup in 2013. It was a successful campaign for Clare, as a 1-21 to 1-13 defeat of Tipperary gave O'Donnell a winners' medal in that competition. Later that year he made his championship debut at left corner-forward in a Munster quarter-final defeat of Waterford. The rest of the championship campaign saw O'Donnell dropped from the starting fifteen for several games, however, he was a late addition at full-forward for Clare's All-Ireland final replay against Cork. His selection seemed surprising but was justified, as O'Donnell scored a hat-trick of goals in the first nineteen minutes of the game. Further goals from Conor McGrath and Darach Honan secured a 5-16 to 3-16 victory following a classic championship decider. The win gave O'Donnell an All-Ireland medal, while he was also named man of the match.

In October 2013, O'Donnell won the Opel Player of the Month Award for September.

In June 2021, he received a heavy blow when training with the Clare team that left him with a serious concussion. It ruled him out of the 2021 Championship.
He returned to the Clare panel in March 2022.

Personal life
O’Donnell completed a PhD in Microbiology in 2021. Between 2018 and 2019, he spent six months in Harvard University as the recipient of a Fulbright scholarship.

Career statistics

Honours

Clare
All-Ireland Senior Hurling Championship (1): 2013
Waterford Crystal Cup (1): 2013
All-Ireland Under-21 Hurling Championship (2): 2013 2014
Munster Under-21 Hurling Championship (2): 2013 2014
Munster Minor Hurling Championship (1) : 2011

Awards
All-Star Award (1): 2022
The Sunday Game Team of the Year (1): 2022
All-Ireland Senior Hurling Championship Final Man of the Match (1): 2013 (replay)

References

1994 births
Living people
Éire Óg Ennis hurlers
Clare inter-county hurlers
All-Ireland Senior Hurling Championship winners